In mathematics, a perfect power is a natural number that is a product of equal natural factors, or, in other words, an integer that can be expressed as a square or a higher integer power of another integer greater than one. More formally, n is a perfect power if there exist natural numbers m > 1, and k > 1 such that mk = n. In this case, n may be called a perfect kth power. If k = 2 or k = 3, then n is called a perfect square or perfect cube, respectively. Sometimes 0 and 1 are also considered perfect powers (0k = 0 for any k > 0, 1k = 1 for any k).

Examples and sums 
A sequence of perfect powers can be generated by iterating through the possible values for m and k. The first few ascending perfect powers in numerical order (showing duplicate powers) are : 
 

The sum of the reciprocals of the perfect powers (including duplicates such as 34 and 92, both of which equal 81) is 1:

which can be proved as follows:

The first perfect powers without duplicates are:
(sometimes 0 and 1), 4, 8, 9, 16, 25, 27, 32, 36, 49, 64, 81, 100, 121, 125, 128, 144, 169, 196, 216, 225, 243, 256, 289, 324, 343, 361, 400, 441, 484, 512, 529, 576, 625, 676, 729, 784, 841, 900, 961, 1000, 1024, ... 

The sum of the reciprocals of the perfect powers p without duplicates is:

where μ(k) is the Möbius function and ζ(k) is the Riemann zeta function.

This is sometimes known as the Goldbach–Euler theorem.

Detecting perfect powers
Detecting whether or not a given natural number n is a perfect power may be accomplished in many different ways, with varying levels of complexity.

This method can immediately be simplified by instead considering only prime values of k. Because of this result, the minimal value of k must necessarily be prime.

As an example, consider n = 296·360·724. Since gcd(96, 60, 24) = 12, n is a perfect 12th power (and a perfect 6th power, 4th power, cube and square, since 6, 4, 3 and 2 divide 12).

Gaps between perfect powers
In 2002 Romanian mathematician Preda Mihăilescu proved that the only pair of consecutive perfect powers is 23 = 8 and 32 = 9, thus proving Catalan's conjecture.

Pillai's conjecture states that for any given positive integer k there are only a finite number of pairs of perfect powers whose difference is k. This is an unsolved problem.

See also
 Prime power

References

External links 
Lluís Bibiloni, Pelegrí Viader, and Jaume Paradís, On a Series of Goldbach and Euler, 2004 (Pdf)

Number theory
Integer sequences